Marion is a town in, and the county seat of, Smyth County, Virginia, United States.  It is positioned upon Interstate 81, in the Blue Ridge portion of the Southern Appalachian mountains in Southwest Virginia. The town is named for American Revolutionary War officer Francis Marion. The town limits had a population of approximately 6,000, per 2020 Census estimates. However, together with the neighborhoods, an additional 9,000 residents residing in unincorporated Smyth County have Marion mailing addresses, granting the Marion, VA ZIP code (24354) a total population of about 14,500, which is around half of the county's total population.

Geography
Marion, Virginia is the location of two large side-by-side ground storage water tower tanks, which are separately labeled "HOT" (in red letters) and "COLD" (in blue). The landmarks, positioned just off of Marion exit 47, are visible to both north and south bound Interstate 81 traffic lanes.

Marion is located at  (36.8370, −81.5165).

According to the United States Census Bureau, the town has a total area of 5.2 square miles (10.7 km2), all of it land.

Marion is home to Hungry Mother State Park, one of the six original Virginia State Parks from the 1930s.

Demographics

2020 census

As of the 2020 United States Census, there were 6,022 people, 2,573 households, and 1,394 families residing within the town limits.

2000 census
As of the census of 2000, there were 6,500 people, 2,677 households, and 1,648 families residing in the town. The population density was 1,528.3 people per square mile (590.7/km2). There were 2,865 housing units at an average density of 689.6 per square mile (266.6/km2). The racial makeup of the town was 91.98% White, 5.94% African American, 0.24% Native American, 0.52% Asian, 0.02% Pacific Islander, 0.38% from other races, and 0.93% from two or more races. Hispanic or Latino of any race were 1.13% of the population.

There were 2,677 households, out of which 24.4% had children under the age of 18 living with them, 42.6% were married couples living together, 14.3% had a female householder with no husband present, and 39.0% were non-families. 36.5% of all households were made up of individuals, and 19.3% had someone living alone who was 65 years of age or older. The average household size was 2.13 and the average family size was 2.76.

In the town, the population was spread out, with 19.4% under the age of 18, 9.7% from 18 to 24, 26.0% from 25 to 44, 24.2% from 45 to 64, and 20.7% who were 65 years of age or older. The median age was 42 years. For every 100 females, there were 88.1 males. For every 100 females age 18 and over, there were 86.2 males.

The current (2020) median income for a household in the town is $54,652.

History

Marion College, a two-year Lutheran women's college, operated from 1873 to 1967. Marion College, constructed in 1968 and named in honor of Francis Marion, is a residence hall at Roanoke College.

Marion is the birthplace of the soft drink Mountain Dew. Although Mountain Dew was first marketed under that name in Knoxville, TN, the original soft drink's formula changed drastically from Knoxville's formula to the syrup mixture that constitutes today's drink, which is Marion's version. In 1961, the rights to Mountain Dew were purchased by the Marion-based Tip Corporation. The Mountain Dew flavor was reworked by Marion resident William H. "Bill" Jones. Due to the success of the revised formulation, the Pepsi Corporation purchased the Tip Corporation in 1964. Marion also hosted the Mountain Dew Festival for more than 50 years.

Back of the Dragon, a segment of SR16 popular among motorcycle and sports car enthusiasts for its sharp turns and scenic overlooks, begins in Marion, Virginia.

R. T. Greer and Company, Henderson Building, Hotel Lincoln, Hungry Mother State Park Historic District, Lincoln Theatre, Marion Historic District, Marion Male Academy, Norfolk & Western Railway Depot, Preston House, and the Abijah Thomas House are listed on the National Register of Historic Places.

Notable people 

 Sherwood Anderson (1876 - 1941), American author, was buried in Marion
 William Pat Jennings (1919 - 1994) 28th Clerk of the United States House of Representatives.
 Nolan Ryan, Major League Baseball's Hall of Fame pitcher, was assigned to a minor league team in the Appalachian League called the Marion Mets (1965–1976) in Marion
 William E. "Billy" Wagner, Major League Baseball pitcher
 Katherine Johnson (1918 – 2020), an American NASA mathematician, taught in Marion

Climate
The climate in this area has mild differences between highs and lows, and there is adequate rainfall year-round.  According to the Köppen Climate Classification system, Marion has a humid subtropical climate, abbreviated "Cfb" on climate maps. Marion's typical temperature numbers are usually around 45/25 F in January, and 85/65 F in July.

References

Towns in Smyth County, Virginia
Towns in Virginia
County seats in Virginia
U.S. Route 11